Hunt v Wilson [1978] 2 NZLR 261 is a cited case in New Zealand regarding conditional contracts.

Background
Hunt and Wilson jointly owned some farmland. After a falling out between the 2 parties, Hunt agreed to sell his share to Wilson, conditional on the price being agreed by valuers. If the valuers did not agree to a price, then the matter was to be referred to arbitration.

However, several years had passed without the valuers coming to agreement, and for unknown reasons, the matter was not subsequently referred to arbitration.

As a result, a frustrated Hunt tried to rescind the sale contract.

Held
The Court of Appeal rule that Hunt could not legally rescind this contract.

References

Court of Appeal of New Zealand cases
New Zealand contract case law
1978 in case law
1978 in New Zealand law